Flora is all the plant life present in a particular region or time, generally the naturally occurring (indigenous) native plants.  Sometimes bacteria and fungi are also referred to as flora, as in the terms gut flora or skin flora.

Etymology
The word "flora" comes from the Latin name of  Flora, the goddess of plants, flowers, and fertility in Roman mythology. The technical term "flora" is then derived from a metonymy of this goddess at the end of the sixteenth century.  It was first used in poetry to denote the natural vegetation of an area, but soon also assumed the meaning of a work cataloguing such vegetation. Moreover, "Flora" was used to refer to the flowers of an artificial garden in the seventeenth century.

The distinction between vegetation (the general appearance of a community) and flora (the taxonomic composition of a community) was first made by Jules Thurmann (1849). Prior to this, the two terms were used indiscriminately.

Classifications

Plants are grouped into floras based on region (floristic regions), period, special environment, or climate. Regions can be distinct habitats like mountain vs. flatland. Floras can mean plant life of a historic era as in fossil flora. Lastly, floras may be subdivided by special environments:

Native flora. The native and indigenous flora of an area.
Agricultural and horticultural flora (garden flora). The plants that are deliberately grown by humans.
Weed flora. Traditionally this classification was applied to plants regarded as undesirable and studied in efforts to control or eradicate them.  Today the designation is less often used as a classification of plant life since it includes three different types of plants: weedy species, invasive species (that may or may not be weedy), and native and introduced non-weedy species that are agriculturally undesirable.  Many native plants previously considered weeds have been shown to be beneficial or even necessary to various ecosystems.

Documentation

The flora of a particular area or time period can be documented in a publication also known as a "flora" (often capitalized as "Flora" to distinguish the two meanings when they might be confused). Floras may require specialist botanical knowledge to use with any effectiveness. Traditionally they are books, but some are now published on CD-ROM or websites.

Simon Paulli's Flora Danica of 1648 is probably the first book titled "Flora" to refer to the plant world of a certain region. It mainly describes medicinal plants growing in Denmark. The Flora Sinensis by the Polish Jesuit Michał Boym is another early example of a book titled "Flora". However, despite its title it covered not only plants but also some animals of the region, that is China and India.

A published flora often contains diagnostic keys. Often these are  dichotomous keys, which require the user to examine a plant repeatedly, and decide which one of two alternatives given best applies to the plant.

See also
 Biome — a major regional group of distinctive plant and animal communities
 Fauna 
 Fauna and Flora Preservation Society
 Funga – a term equivalent to flora for fungi
 Herbal
 Horticultural flora
 Megaflora
 Pharmacopoeia
 The Plant List
 Vegetation — a general term for the plant life of a region
World Flora Online

 Categories
 Flora by continent
 Flora by country
 Flora by ecoregion
 Flora by floristic kingdom

References

External links 

 eFloras — a collection of on-line floras
 Chilebosque — checklist of Chilean native flora 
 Flora of NW Europe with descriptions and a quiz to test your knowledge
 Flora of Australia Online
 Flora of New Zealand Series Online
 E-Flora of Kerala by Dr N Sasidharan

 
Botanical nomenclature
Ecology terminology
Habitat
Organisms